The list of those invited to join the Academy of Motion Picture Arts and Sciences as members in 2010.

Actors

Animators

Art directors

At-large

Casting directors

Cinematographers

Costume designers

Directors

Documentary

Executives

Film editors

Live action short films

Makeup and hairstylists

Music

Producers

Production designers

Public relations

Set decorators

Sound

Visual effects

Writers

See also 

List of invitees for AMPAS Membership (2009)

References

2010
Invitees,2010